Catephia nigropicta is a species of moth of the  family Erebidae. It is found in Madagascar.

References

Catephia
Moths described in 1880
Moths of Africa